Farah Chamma (Arabic: فرح شمّا) is a Palestinian spoken-word poet who was born in the United Arab Emirates in April, 1994. Chamma speaks six languages including Arabic, English, and French. She is one of the young poets at the "Poeticians Club" which is a group of poets from the Middle East run by the Palestinian filmmaker and writer Hind Shoufani. She is the founder of  Parea band which combines music with spoken-word.

Education and career  
Farah Chamma is a Palestinian poet from Nablus. She was born in April 1994, Sharjah,the United Arab Emirates. At the age of eighteen, Farah moved to Brazil and lived there for four months during which she learned the Portuguese language. Chamma obtained her bachelor's degree in philosophy and sociology at Paris-Sorbonne University Abu Dhabi. She has learned French while studying at University and then learned German and Spanish. In her final year at university, she moved to France and lived there for a while. Chamma began her career at the age of fourteen and started performing on different stages. Since 2008, she has participated in several events and festivals, including the “Sikka Art Fair” which was organized by Dubai Culture and Arts Authority and a symposium named “A Sip of Poetry” that was held in Abu Dhabi in 2012. Recently, the Emirates Airline Festival of Literature in its twelfth session organized the Identity Poetics session in which Farah Chamma was featured among other poets including award-winning Colombian-American poet Carlos Adres Gomez and UAE performance poetry star Afra Atiq. Chamma has been accepted to study a master's in performance and culture at Goldsmiths, University of London.

In 2013, Chamma released a YouTube video where she recited her Arabic poem How Must I Believe. The video received more than 250,000 views. On January 4, 2014, she published another video performance, The Nationality. In February 2019, Chamma performed in London along with oud and guitar player Maruan Betawi and percussionist Phelan Burgoyne. Chamma also has an Arabic language podcast named "Maqsouda" which is about Arabic poetry created and hosted by both Zeina Hashem Beck and Farah Chamma.

Poetry collections 
 Apologies  (Original title: Al Maathera)
 The Nationality (Original title: Al Gensia) 
 From right to left (Original title: Min Al Yamin Ela Al Shamal) 
 But We sleep Because Gravity weighs us down (Original title: Wla Kinana Nanam Li Ana Al Gathbia Tothqelona) 
 I not going to marry, mum (Original Title: Mish Rah Atjawaz Yamma)
 The Sheesha (Original title: Al Sheesha) 
 Prayer (Original title: Doaa
 What are you afraid of Mum? (Original title: Min Sho Khaifa Ya Emmi?) )
 Paranoia 
 Fairouz 
 Small Manifesto 
 Farah 
 pH
 Dead Cats and Plastic Bags 
 I am No Plastenian 
 Boxes 
 The Wall
 Ether
 Fast Poem 
 On Gaspille
 How Must I Believe

References

Living people
1994 births
Slam poets
Palestinian poets
Palestinian women poets